Wesley Moodie and Dick Norman were defending champions, but they lost in the semifinals against Robert Lindstedt and Horia Tecău.Lindstedt and Tecău won the final 1–6, 7–5, [10–7] against Lukáš Dlouhý and Leander Paes.

Seeds

Main draw

Draw

References
 Main Draw

UNICEF Open - Men's Doubles
Rosmalen Grass Court Championships